Alex Hurst is a former Scotland international rugby league footballer who last played for the Swinton Lions and now plays rugby union for Preston Grasshoppers R.F.C. He spent the 2013 season in the Super League with the London Broncos.

Club career
On 15 May 2017 it was announced that free-agent Hurst had switched codes to join Preston Grasshoppers R.F.C.

International
He is a Scotland international having made his début in 2011. He was named in their squad for the 2013 Rugby League World Cup.

In October and November 2014, Alex played in the 2014 European Cup competition.

References

External links

1990 births
Living people
English rugby league players
English people of Scottish descent
London Broncos players
London Skolars players
Preston Grasshoppers R.F.C. players
Rugby league fullbacks
Rugby league players from Salford
Rugby union players from Salford
Swinton Lions players
Scotland national rugby league team players